The Daejeon Metropolitan Council is the local council of Daejeon, South Korea.

There are a total of 22 members, with 19 members elected in the First-past-the-post voting system and 3 members elected in Party-list proportional representation.

Current composition 

Negotiation groups can be formed by 4 or more members. There are currently a negotiation group in the council, formed by the Democratic Party of Korea only.

Organization 
The structure of Council consists of:
Chairman
Two Vice-chairmen
Standing Committees
Steering Committee
Administration and Autonomy Committee
Welfare and Environment Committee
Industry and Construction Committee
Education Committee
Special Committees
Special Committees on Budget and Accounts
Special Committees on Ethics

Recent election results

2018 

|- style="text-align:center;"
! rowspan="2" colspan="3" width="200" | Party
! colspan="4" | Constituency
! colspan="4" | Party list
! colspan="2" | Total seats
|- style="text-align:center;"
! width="60" | Votes
! width="40" | %
! width="40" | Seats
! width="32" | ±
! width="60" | Votes
! width="40" | %
! width="40" | Seats
! width="32" | ±
! width="40" | Seats
! width="32" | ±
|-
| width="1" style="background-color:" |
| style="text-align:left;" colspan=2| Democratic Party of Korea
| 442,612 || 64.17 || 19 || 5
| 384,083 || 55.21 || 2 || 0
| 21 || 5
|-
| width="1" style="background-color:" |
| style="text-align:left;" colspan=2| Liberty Korea Party
| 211,871 || 30.72 || 0 || 5
| 183,819 || 26.42 || 1 || 0
| 1 || 5
|-
| width="1" style="background-color:" |
| style="text-align:left;" colspan=2| Bareunmirae Party
| 33,486 || 4.86 || 0 || new
| 61,971 || 8.90 || 0 || new
| 0 || new
|-
| width="1" style="background-color:" |
| style="text-align:left;" colspan=2| Justice Party
| colspan=4 
| 54,292 || 7.80 || 1 || 0
| 0 || 0
|-
| width="1" style="background-color:" |
| style="text-align:left;" colspan=2| Green Party Korea
| colspan=4 
| 4,509 || 0.64 || 0 || new
| 0 || new
|-
| width="1" style="background-color:" |
| style="text-align:left;" colspan=2| Minjung Party
| 1,734 || 0.25 || 0 || new
| 3,613 || 0.51 || 0 || new
| 0 || new
|-
| width="1" style="background-color:#DC143C" |
| style="text-align:left;" colspan=2| Labor Party
| colspan=4 
| 3,315 || 0.47 || 0 || new
| 0 || new
|-
|- style="background-color:#E9E9E9"
| colspan=3 style="text-align:center;" | Total
| 689,703 || 100.00 || 19 || –
| 695,602 || 100.00 || 3 || –
| 22 || –
|}

References 

Daejeon
Provincial councils of South Korea